He Xin (born 18 April 1999) is a Chinese footballer currently playing as a midfielder for Shaanxi Chang'an Athletic, on loan from Chengdu Rongcheng.

Club career
He Xin would play for the Guangzhou youth team before joining second tier football club Chengdu Rongcheng on 10 September 2020. He would go on to make his debut for the club in a league game on 12 September 2020 against Beijing Renhe, which ended in a 3-2 victory. The following season he would establish himself as a vital member within the team and aid them to promotion to the top tier at the end of the 2021 league campaign.

Career statistics
.

References

External links

1998 births
Living people
Chinese footballers
Association football midfielders
China League One players
Guangzhou F.C. players
Chengdu Rongcheng F.C. players